Boris Ilich Marshak (July 9, 1933 – 28 July 2006) was an archeologist who spent more than fifty years excavating the Sogdian ruins at Panjakent, Tajikistan.

Biography

Boris Ilich Marshak was born in Luga, Leningrad Oblast, Russian SFSR July 9, 1933. He received an MA in archaeology from Moscow University in 1956, his PhD in archaeology from the Institute of Archaeology, Leningrad in 1965 and a doctorate of historical sciences from Moscow University in 1982.

Marshak began his work at the Sogdian ruins, which date from the 5th-8th century, at Panjakent in 1954. He became director of the archaeological expedition in 1978, a position he held until his death. Marshak was a leading authority on the history of Panjakent, the archaeology and art history of Central Asia, and medieval eastern silverware. In 1979 he became head of the Department of Central Asia and Caucasus at the Hermitage, in Leningrad.

After the fall of the Soviet Union in 1991 Marshak's job became significantly more difficult. Funding for fieldwork dried up and he instantly became a foreigner in the new state of Tajikistan at a time when ethnic Russians were fleeing Central Asia in mass. Marshak stayed on as director of the excavation of the Panjakent ruins, even during the years of civil war in Tajikistan from 1992 to 1997, while other archeological sites in the former Soviet Union were plundered by looters. Through close cooperation with the government of Tajikistan Marshak insured protection and continued excavation of the Panjakent ruins. In the 1990s and first decade of the 21st century Marshak received numerous honorariums from international organizations and taught, lectured and conducted fellowships in Italy, the United States, Austria and elsewhere.

Marshak died 28 July 2006 on the site of the Panjakent ruins. He was buried at the site, as requested in his will.

Honorary awards and memberships

 2002 Foreign associate Member of the Academie des Inscriptions et Belles-Lettres, (Institut de France).
 1999 Order of Friendship, Tajikistan.
 1998 Foreign Corresponding Member of the Academie des Inscriptions et Belles-Lettres (Institut de France).
 1995 Honorary Member of the Archaeological Institute of America.
 1991 Honorary Fellow of the Royal Asiatic Society of the Great Britain and Ireland.
 1990 Corresponding Member of IsMEO (Institute of the Middle and Far East, Rome).
 1989 Prix Ghirshman de L'Academie (Academie des Inscriptions et Belles-Lettres, Institut de France).
 Ferdousi premium – London.
 Order of Honor - Russia.

Partial list of published works
Note that Marshak's works were published under the names Boris Ilich Marshak, Boris I. Marshak, B. I. Marshak, and Boris Marshak.

Books

 "Legends, Tales and Fables in the Art of Sogdiana. " Persica Press. New York. 2002.
 "Murals along the Silk Road: Combined Art-Historical and Laboratory Study" St. Petersburg. 1999. coauthor.
 "Sokrovishcha Khana Kubrata Pereshepinskii klad". St. Petersburg. 1997. coauthor.
 "The Treasures of Khan Kubrat". St.Petersburg. 1997 coauthor.
 "Treasures from the Obf Basin". Exhibition Catalogue. St. Petersburg, 1996. coeditor.
 "Silberschätze des Orients". Metallkunst des 3-13. Jahrhunderts und ihre Kontinuität, Leipzig. 1986.
 "The Painting of Sogdiana." Part One of the book: Azarpay G. Sogdian Painting. Berkeley. 1981. pp. 11–77. co author
 "Sogdian Silver. " Moscow, 1971. In Russian.
 Contributor

Articles

 “Une peinture kouchane sur toile.” Académie des Inscriptions & Belles-lettres, Comptes rendus des séances de l'année 2006 avril-juin. Paris 2006. pp. 947–963.
 “The Archaeology of Sogdiana.” The Silk Road, 1/2. December 2003. pp. 3–8
 “A Sogdian Silver Bowl from the Freer Gallery of Art.” Ars Orientalis XXIX, 1999.
 “L'Art Sogdien (IVe-IXe siecle)”. Les Arts de 1' Asie Centrale. Paris. 1999. pp. 114–163.
 “Sogd”. A chapter in “Istoriia tadzhikskogo naroda” [History of the Tajik People]. Dushanbe. 2000.
 “Sogd V-VIII w. Ideologiia po pamiatnikam isskustva" A chapter in "Arkheologija. Srednjaja Azija i Dal'nii Vostok v epokhu srednevekov'ia. Srednjaja Azija v rannem srednevekov'e. " G. Brykina ed. (Moscow: [Nauka], 1999). pp. 175–191.
 “Sogdian Art.” Chapters in "New History of World Art, ‘Shogakukan’." 1999. Vol.15. pp. 207-218, 386-395
 “Le mythe de Nana dans l'art de la Sogdiane.” Arts Asiatiques. 1998. pp. 5–18. coauthor.
 “The Tiger, Raised from the Dead: Two Murals from Panjikent.” "Bulletin of the Asia Institute. " Vol. 10. 1996. pp. 207–17.
 “Sughd.” Chapter in "History of Civilization of Central Asia", Vol. III. UNESCO Publishing. 1996. pp. 233–58.
 “On the Iconography of Ossuaries from Biya Naiman.” "Silk Road Art and Archaeology." Kamakura. Vol 4. 1995. Issue 6. pp. 299–321.
 “Le programme iconographique des peintures de la "Salle des Ambassadeurs"  Afrasiab (Samarkand).” Arts Asiatiques. Tome XLIX. 1994. pp. 1-20.
 “The Historico-Cultural Significance of the Sogdian Calendar.” Iran. Vol. XXX. London. 1992. pp. 145–54.
 “Worshippers from the Northern Shrine of Temple II, Panjikent.” Bulletin of the Asia Institute Vol. 8. 1994. pp. 187–207. coauthor.
 “Cultes communautaires et cultes prives en Sogdiane.”  "Histoire et cultes de 1'Asie Centrale preislamique. " Paris, CNRS. 1991. pp. 187–195. coauthor.
 “A Hunting Scene from Panjikent.” "Bulletin of the Asia Institute." Vol. 4. 1990. pp. 77–94.
 “Les fouilles de Pendjikent.” [CRAI]. 1990. pp. 286–313.
 “Wall Painting from a House with a Granary. Panjikent, 1st Quarter of the Eighth Century A.D.” "Silk Road Art and Archaeology." Vol.1. 1990. pp. 123–176.
 “Some Notes on the Tomb of Li-Xian and his Wife under Northern Zhou Dynasty at Guyuan, Ningxia and its Gold-Gilt Silver Ewer with Greek Mythological Scenes Unearthed There.” Cultura Antiqua. Vol. 4. No. 4. 1989. pp. 49–57. coauthor. In Japanese with English subtitle.
 “Une image sogdienne du dieu-patriarche de I'agriculture.” Studia Iranica, Vol. 6. Issue 2. 1987. pp. 193–199. coauthor.
 “Iskusstvo Sogda.” Chapter in ‘Tsentral'naia Aziia.’” Novye Pamiatniki pis'mennosti i iskusstva. Moscow. 1987. pp. 233-248.
 “Raskopki gorodishcha drevnego Pendzhikenta v 1977 g.”. "Arkheologicheskie raboty v Tadzhikistane. " Vol. XVII. 1977. Dushanbe. 1984. pp. 187–229. coauthor.
 “Oriental Analogien zu den Bauwerken von Typus des eingeschriebenen Kreuzes: Pendzikent und Bamian, V-VII Jh.” Chapter in B. Brentjes, ed., "Probleme der Architektur des Orients, Halle." Saale. 1983. pp. 53–64. In Russian.
 “The Paintings of Sogdiana.” Chapter in G. Azarpay, "Sogdian Painting: The Pictorial Epic in Oriental Art. " Berkeley, 1981. pp. 11–77. coauthor.
 “Sotsial'naya struktura naseleniya drevnego Pendzhikenta.” Chapter in B. Gafurov, G. F. Girs and E. A. Davidovich, eds., "Tovarno-denezhnye otnosheniya na Blizhnem i Srednem Vostoke v eµpokhu srednevekov'ya." Moscow. 1979. pp. 19–26. coauthor.
 “Drevneîshee izobrazhenie osadnoî mashiny v Sredneî Azii.” Chapter in V. G. Lukonin, ed., "Kul'tura Vostoka: Drevnost' i rannee serdnevekov'e. " Moscow. 1978. pp. 215–21. coauthor.
 “Stennye rospisi, obnaruzhennye v 1970 gody na gorodishche drevnego Pendzhikenta.”  "Soobshcheniya Gosudarstvennogo E˜rmitazha. " 36. Leningrad. 1973. pp. 58–64.
 “L'art de Piandjikent aà la lumiére des derniéres fouilles (1958-1968).” Arts Asiatiques. Vol. 23. 1971. pp. 3–39. coauthor.

References

External links 
 Marshak's Biography
 Review of Marshak's book "Legends, Tales and Fables in the Art of Sogdiana."
 Photo of Marshak from the Hermitage

1933 births
2006 deaths
People from Luga, Leningrad Oblast
Central Asian studies scholars
Russian archaeologists
Archaeology of Tajikistan
Soviet archaeologists
20th-century archaeologists